"Unleash" is a song by American heavy metal band Soulfly from the 2008 album Conquer. This single, along with music video, was released a month before the album's release and was the album's first of two singles. Dave Peters (member of Throwdown) is the guest vocalist, and helped Max Cavalera write lyrics prior to the recording.

Cavalera's wishful thoughts 
Max Cavalera quoted on the Roadrunner website about his appreciation with Dave Peters, "To work with David was a trip. The song's a full assault, and it feels really natural. It's got that uncompromising attitude." He also had wishful thoughts about this song, "It's the closest thing I've done to Pantera. Dave put some killer lyrics to the music. The fast part at the end is my favorite part on the album."

Lyrics and composition 
The song is about unleashing war multiple times to make the war progressively more devastating. As a result, 'unleash' is said sixteen times in the lyrics, twelve are used in verb phrases per line three times each: 'unleash war', 'unleash my wrath', 'unleash revenge', and 'unleash my hell'; the remaining four is as the lone word per line, sung right before the song ends. The lyric also features eight consecutive idioms in order: 'war after war', 'hell after hell', 'scum after scum', 'hill after hills', 'pig after pig', 'stone after stone', 'doom after doom' and 'hate after hate'.

This song utilises breakdowns, relatively uncommon in Soulfly's later work, with a lighter world music section in the middle of the song.

Music video 
The music video shows the members performing inside El Castillo, Chichen Itza, a Mayan pyramid. Later, tribes show up and chug to the song. In the end, a tribe picks up a bloody tissue. It was directed by Robert J. Sexton.

Personnel 
 Max Cavalera – vocals, 4-string guitar, berimbau, sitar, production
 Marc Rizzo – guitar, flamenco guitar
 Bobby Burns – bass guitar
 Joe Nuñez – drums, percussion
 Dave Peters – additional vocals
 Andy Sneap – mixing
 Gloria Cavalera – management
 Christina Stajanovic – assistant
 Bryan Roberts – assistant

References 

Soulfly songs
2008 singles
2008 songs
Songs written by Max Cavalera
Roadrunner Records singles